The Potez 23 was a prototype French single-engine fighter biplane designed in 1923.

History 
The Potez 23 was built by Potez in response to the C1 fighter program issued by the STAé in 1923.

The structure was made of wooden spars, the fuselage was covered with screwed and glued plywood, and the wings, empennage, and tail were covered in canvas.  Wing tethering is simplified and builds on the experience gained on the Potez XV.

The aircraft did achieve the required performance and was not accepted for production.  However, it was developed into the Potez 25.

Specifications

References 

1920s French experimental aircraft
Biplanes
23
Aircraft first flown in 1923
Single-engined tractor aircraft